Muhammad Ali vs. Trevor Berbick, billed as "Drama in Bahama", was a ten-round boxing match that took place in Nassau, Bahamas on December 11, 1981. Ali was 39 years old at this time, and Berbick was 27 years old. The fight went the distance with Berbick winning through a unanimous decision on points. This was Ali's last boxing match.

Background
Prior to the fight, Ali claimed that he had been declared fit by "even the best white doctors." Nevertheless, the venue for the fight—Nassau in the Bahamas—was chosen because no American state would grant Ali a boxing license after his performance in the  match with Larry Holmes.

The promoter of this fight was James Cornelius, a convicted felon with links to the Nation of Islam. However, a problem arose since Don King had signed up Berbick for a three-fight deal. When King arrived in Nassau to demand his share of the profits from this fight, he was greeted by two friends of Cornelius who administered a sound beating to King.

Ali had hoped to use this fight to earn a title bid against Mike Weaver the World Boxing Association Champ. Ali said "The stage is set for me. I love this sort of situation".

One reporter described him as Michelin Man. Ticket sales for the fight were so slow that the promoters ended up offering them at a heavy discounted price. Ultimately, fewer than 7,500 people witnessed this fight. There was no pay-per-view television; no American network had even made a bid. However, ONTV aired the fight, with it airing at least in Cincinnati, Ohio.

The fight took place in the unfinished Queen Elizabeth Sports Centre. When people arrived to see the fight they found they could not get in because the key to the main gate had been misplaced. When the key was found, it was discovered that there were no boxing gloves at the venue. There was also no bell to signal the end of a round; ultimately a hastily procured cowbell had to be used for this purpose. Because of the paucity of paying spectators Berbick refused to fight unless he was paid upfront. The fight started more than two hours behind schedule.

The fight
In the early rounds, Ali tried putting together some combinations, but these proved ineffectual and he was pushed back on the ropes. In the fifth round, Ali landed some solid jabs and then a right-left-right combination on Berbick, but by the sixth round Ali had tired and started getting hit. By the last round, Ali was completely exhausted. Sportswriter Hugh McIlvanney, who witnessed the fight, wrote:

References

Berbick
1981 in boxing
December 1981 sports events in North America
1981 in Bahamian sport
Boxing in the Bahamas
Nicknamed sporting events